The following is a list of the Top 10 Independent Films chosen annually by the National Board of Review of Motion Pictures, beginning in 2006.

Lists

2000s

 2006:
 10 Items or Less
 Akeelah and the Bee
 Bobby
 Catch a Fire
 Copying Beethoven
 A Guide to Recognizing Your Saints 
 Half Nelson
 The Illusionist
 Lonesome Jim 
 Sherrybaby
 Thank You for Smoking

 2007:
 Away from Her
 Great World of Sound
 Honeydripper
 In the Valley of Elah
 A Mighty Heart 
 The Namesake
 Once
 The Savages 
 Starting Out in the Evening
 Waitress

 2008:
 Frozen River
 In Bruges
 In Search of a Midnight Kiss
 Mister Foe
 Rachel Getting Married 
 Snow Angels
 Son of Rambow
 Wendy and Lucy 
 Vicky Cristina Barcelona
 The Visitor

 2009:
 Amreeka
 District 9
 Goodbye Solo
 Humpday
 In the Loop 
 Julia
 Me and Orson Welles
 Moon 
 Sugar
 Two Lovers

2010s

 2010:
 Animal Kingdom
 Buried
 Fish Tank
 The Ghost Writer
 Greenberg
 Let Me In
 Monsters
 Please Give
 Somewhere
 Youth in Revolt

 2011:
 50/50
 Another Earth
 Beginners
 A Better Life
 Cedar Rapids
 Margin Call
 Shame
 Take Shelter
 We Need To Talk About Kevin
 Win Win

 2012:
 Arbitrage
 Bernie
 Compliance
 End of Watch
 Hello I Must Be Going
 Little Birds
 Moonrise Kingdom
 On the Road
 Quartet
 Sleepwalk with Me

 2013:
 Ain't Them Bodies Saints
 Dallas Buyers Club
 In a World...
 Mother of George
 Much Ado About Nothing
 Mud
 The Place Beyond the Pines
 Short Term 12
 Sightseers
 The Spectacular Now

 2014:
 Blue Ruin
 Locke
 A Most Wanted Man
 Mr. Turner
 Obvious Child
 The Skeleton Twins
 Snowpiercer
 Stand Clear of the Closing Doors
 Starred Up
 Still Alice

 2015:
 '71
 45 Years
 Cop Car
 Ex Machina
 Grandma
 It Follows
 James White
 Mississippi Grind
 Welcome to Me
 While We’re Young

 2016:
 20th Century Women
 Captain Fantastic
 Creative Control
 Eye in the Sky
 The Fits
 Green Room
 Hello, My Name Is Doris
 Krisha
 Morris from America
 Sing Street

 2017:
 Beatriz at Dinner
 Brigsby Bear
 A Ghost Story
 Lady Macbeth
 Logan Lucky
 Loving Vincent
 Menashe
 Norman: The Moderate Rise and Tragic Fall of a New York Fixer
 Patti Cake$
 Wind River

 2018:
 The Death of Stalin
 Lean on Pete
 Leave No Trace
 Mid90s
 The Old Man & the Gun
 The Rider
 Searching
 Sorry to Bother You
 We the Animals
 You Were Never Really Here

 2019:
 The Farewell
 Give Me Liberty
 A Hidden Life
 Judy
 The Last Black Man in San Francisco
 Midsommar
 The Nightingale
 The Peanut Butter Falcon
 The Souvenir
 Wild Rose

2020s

 2020:
 The Climb
 Driveways
 Farewell Amor
 Miss Juneteenth
 The Nest
 Never Rarely Sometimes Always
 The Outpost
 Relic
 Saint Frances
 Wolfwalkers

 2021:
 The Card Counter
 C'mon C'mon
 CODA
 The Green Knight
 Holler
 Jockey
 Old Henry
 Pig
 Shiva Baby
 The Souvenir Part II

 2022:
 Armageddon Time
 Emily the Criminal
 The Eternal Daughter
 Funny Pages
 The Inspection
 Living
 A Love Song
 Nanny
 To Leslie
 The Wonder

References

External links
 National Board of Review of Motion Pictures: Top 10 Independent Films

Awards established in 2006
National Board of Review Awards
Top film lists